Rothes railway station served the town of Rothes, Moray, Scotland from 1858 to 1968 on the Morayshire Railway.

History 

The station opened on 23 August 1858 by the Morayshire Railway. To the west was a goods yard which started small, but was later enlarged when a platform to Elgin East was added. The station closed to both passengers and goods traffic on 6 May 1968.

References

External links 

Disused railway stations in Moray
Railway stations in Great Britain opened in 1858
Railway stations in Great Britain closed in 1968
Beeching closures in Scotland
Former Great North of Scotland Railway stations
1858 establishments in Scotland
1968 disestablishments in Scotland
Rothes